Giacobazzi is an Italian surname. Notable people with the surname include:

Andrea Giacobazzi (died 1524), Italian Roman Catholic bishop
Anthony Giacobazzi, French rugby union player
Cristoforo Giacobazzi (died 1540), Italian Roman Catholic bishop and cardinal
Domenico Giacobazzi (1444–1528), Italian Roman Catholic bishop and cardinal

Italian-language surnames
Patronymic surnames
Surnames from given names